Digby C. Anderson (born 25 May 1944) is the founder and former director (until 2004) of the Social Affairs Unit, a public policy organisation/economic think-tank created in 1980. In addition to this role, Anderson served as a long-time contributor to several conservative American and British newspapers and magazines including The Spectator and The Daily Telegraph, as well as The American Spectator, The New Criterion, and National Review.

He is a priest in the Church of England.

Books
 Anderson, Digby, Charles Moore, and Michael Heath, The English At Table, Social Affairs Unit, 2006. 
 Anderson, Digby, Decadence: The Passing of Personal Virtue and Its Replacement by Political and Psychological Slogans, Social Affairs Unit, 2005.
 Anderson, Digby, All Oiks Now: The Unnoticed Surrender of Middle England, Social Affairs Unit, 2004.
 Anderson, Digby and Mullen, Peter (eds), Called to Account: The Case for an Audit of the State of the Failing Church of England, Social Affairs Unit, 2003.
 Anderson, Digby (ed), The War on Wisdom, Social Affairs Unit, 2002
 Anderson, Digby, Losing Friends, Social Affairs Unit, 2001.
 Anderson, Digby, The Dictionary of Dangerous Words, Social Affairs Unit, 2000
 Anderson, Digby and Mullen, Peter (eds), Faking it: the Sentimentalisation of Modern Society, Penguin Books, 1998.
 Anderson, Digby and Mosbacher, Michael (eds), British Woman Today: A Qualitative Survey of Images in Women's Magazines, Social Affairs Unit, 1997.
 Anderson, Digby (ed), Health, Lifestyle and Environment: Countering the Panic, Social Affairs Unit, 1991
 Anderson, Digby, Drinking to Your Health: The Allegations and the Evidence, Social Affairs Unit, 1989
 Anderson, Digby (ed), Full Circle?: Bringing Up Children in the Post-permissive Society, Social Affairs Unit, 1988
 Anderson, Digby, The Spectator Book of Imperative Cooking, George G. Harrap and Co., 1987
 Anderson, Digby, A Diet of Reason: Sense and Nonsense in the Healthy Eating Debate, Social Affairs Unit, 1986
 Anderson, Digby, Kindness That Kills: Churches' Simplistic Response to Complex Social Issues, SPCK Publications, 1984

References

External links
The Social Affairs Unit Official website.
Decadence A review of Anderson's work in The New Criterion 
Fear and Loathing
"Barbarians within the Gates"

1944 births
English male journalists
English non-fiction writers
Living people
English male non-fiction writers
21st-century English Anglican priests
Church of England priests